Magoodhoo (Dhivehi: މަގޫދޫ) is one of the inhabited islands of Noonu Atoll.

Geography

Demography

References

Populated places in the Maldives
Islands of the Maldives